The Lady Escapes is a 1937 American comedy film directed by Eugene Forde and starring Gloria Stuart, Michael Whalen, George Sanders and Cora Witherspoon. It is based on a Hungarian play.

Plot summary
A newly married couple argue constantly leading to her fleeing to France in the company of a glamorous French writer, where she is pursued by her husband.

Cast

 Gloria Stuart as Linda Ryan
 Michael Whalen as Michael Hilton
 George Sanders as Rene Blanchard
 Cora Witherspoon as Fanny Worthington
 Gerald Oliver Smith as Reggie Farnworth
 June Brewster as Dolores
 Howard C. Hickman as Judge
 Joseph R. Tozer as Drake
 Don Alvarado as 	Antonio
 Maurice Cass as 	Monsieur Cheval
 Franklin Pangborn as 	Pierre
 Tom Ricketts as 	Uncle George
 Lynn Bari as Bridesmaid 
 Claire Du Brey as 	Woman in Theatre
 Regis Toomey as 	American Reporter 
 Milton Owen as English Reporter
 Theresa Harris as 	Maid 
 Eugene Borden as French Official
 Milton Kibbee as 	American Express Man
 Syd Saylor as Carpenter
 Lon Chaney Jr. as Reporter
 Robert Lowery as Reporter

References

External links
 

1937 films
1930s English-language films
1937 comedy films
American comedy films
Films directed by Eugene Forde
American black-and-white films
20th Century Fox films
American films based on plays
Films set in New York City
Films set in Paris
1930s American films